The American Folk Blues Festival was a music festival that toured Europe as an annual event for several years beginning in 1962.  It introduced audiences in Europe, including the UK, to leading blues performers of the day such as Muddy Waters, Howlin' Wolf, John Lee Hooker and Sonny Boy Williamson, most of whom had never previously performed outside the US.  The tours attracted substantial media coverage, including TV shows, and contributed to the growth of the audience for blues music in Europe.

Background
German jazz publicist Joachim-Ernst Berendt first had the idea of bringing original African-American blues performers to Europe. Jazz and rock and roll had become very popular, and both genres drew influences directly back to the blues. Berendt thought that European audiences would flock to concert halls to see them in person.

Promoters Horst Lippmann and Fritz Rau brought this idea to reality. By contacting Willie Dixon, an influential blues composer and bassist from Chicago, they were given access to the blues culture of the southern United States. The first festival was held in 1962, and they continued almost annually until 1972, after an eight-year hiatus reviving the festival in 1980 until its final performance in 1985.

Performances and audiences
The concerts featured some of the leading blues artists of the 1960s, such as Muddy Waters, Howlin' Wolf, Willie Dixon, John Lee Hooker and Sonny Boy Williamson, some playing in unique combinations such as T-Bone Walker playing guitar for pianist Memphis Slim, Otis Rush with Junior Wells, Sonny Boy Williamson with Muddy Waters. The Festival DVDs include the only known footage of Little Walter, and rare recordings of John Lee Hooker playing harmonica.

The audience at Manchester in 1962, the first venue for the festival in Britain, included Mick Jagger, Keith Richards, Brian Jones and Jimmy Page. Subsequent attendees at the first London festivals are believed to have also included such influential musicians as Eric Burdon, Eric Clapton, and Steve Winwood.  Collectively these were the primary movers in the blues explosion that would lead to the British Invasion.

Sonny Boy Williamson's visit to London with the 1963 festival led to him spending a year in Europe including recording the Sonny Boy Williamson and The Yardbirds album, (first released on Star-Club Records in 1965), and recording with The Animals.

Blues and Gospel Train
On 7 May 1964, Granada Television broadcast Blues and Gospel Train, a programme directed by John Hamp featuring Muddy Waters, Sonny Terry and Brownie McGhee, Sister Rosetta Tharpe, Rev. Gary Davis, Cousin Joe and Otis Spann.  For filming, the company transformed the disused Wilbraham Road railway station into "Chorltonville", giving it the supposed appearance of a southern U.S.-style station.  About 200 fans were brought by train to the platform opposite the performers.  The performance was interrupted by a rainstorm, after which Tharpe performed the gospel song "Didn't It Rain".

Performers
Blues musicians who performed on the American Folk Blues Festival tours included Muddy Waters, Sonny Boy Williamson, John Lee Hooker, Sippie Wallace, T-Bone Walker, Sonny Terry & Brownie McGhee, Memphis Slim, Otis Rush, Lonnie Johnson, Eddie Boyd, Big Walter Horton, Junior Wells, Big Joe Williams, Mississippi Fred McDowell, Willie Dixon, Otis Spann, Big Mama Thornton, Bukka White, Jimmy Reed, Howlin' Wolf (with a band made up of Sunnyland Slim, Hubert Sumlin, Willie Dixon and drummer Clifton James), Champion Jack Dupree, Son House, Armand "Jump" Jackson, Skip James, Sleepy John Estes, Little Brother Montgomery, Victoria Spivey, J. B. Lenoir, Little Walter, Carey Bell, Louisiana Red, Lightnin' Hopkins, Joe Turner, Buddy Guy, Magic Sam, Lee Jackson, Matt "Guitar" Murphy, Roosevelt Sykes, Doctor Ross, Koko Taylor, Hound Dog Taylor, Archie Edwards, Helen Humes and Sugar Pie DeSanto.

Discography
Many of the concerts were released on a long-running annual series of records, which was collated again for release in the 1990s.

Official:
 American Folk Blues Festival, 1962–1968
 The Lost Blues Tapes (1993)
 Blues Giants
 American Folk Blues Festival 1970

Available on DVD:
 The American Folk Blues Festival 1962–1966, Vols 1–3 (black and white, recorded live at the Baden-Baden studio of the German public radio and TV network ARD, and (volume 3) of the Danish national broadcaster. The DVD was by Reelin' In The Years Productions.
 American Folk-Blues Festival: The British Tours 1963–1966

Bootleg:
 Muddy Waters – Hoochie Coochie Man  (Laserlight Fake)

See also

List of blues festivals
List of folk festivals

References

Bibliography
 The First Time We Met The Blues, David Williams, Music Mentor Books,

External links

 American Folk Blues Festival discography
 Muddy Waters – Hoochie Coochie Man (Laserlight Fake) 

Concert tours
1962 concert tours
Blues festivals in France
Blues festivals in Germany
Blues festivals in the United Kingdom
Music festivals established in 1962
Folk festivals in the United Kingdom
Folk festivals in France
Folk festivals in Germany